A partial lunar eclipse took place on Friday, July 17, 1981, the second of two lunar eclipses in 1981. The Earth's shadow on the moon was clearly visible in this eclipse, with 55% of the Moon in shadow; the partial eclipse lasted for 2 hours and 43 minutes.

Visibility 
The partial phase of this lunar eclipse was visible in southeastern North America, South America, western Africa, seen rising over northern North America, and setting over Western Europe and Eastern Africa.

Related lunar eclipses

Eclipses in 1981 
 A penumbral lunar eclipse on Tuesday, 20 January 1981.
 An annular solar eclipse on Wednesday, 4 February 1981.
 A partial lunar eclipse on Friday, 17 July 1981.
 A total solar eclipse on Friday, 31 July 1981.

Lunar year series

Saros series 
It was part of Saros series 119.

Half-Saros cycle
A lunar eclipse will be preceded and followed by solar eclipses by 9 years and 5.5 days (a half saros). This lunar eclipse is related to two total solar eclipses of Solar Saros 126.

Tritos series 
 Preceded: Lunar eclipse of August 17, 1970
 Followed: Lunar eclipse of June 15, 1992

Tzolkinex 
 Preceded: Lunar eclipse of June 4, 1974
 Followed: Lunar eclipse of August 27, 1988

See also 
List of lunar eclipses
List of 20th-century lunar eclipses

Notes

External links 
 

1981-07
1981 in science
July 1981 events